The 1952–53 William & Mary Indians men's basketball team represented the College of William & Mary in intercollegiate basketball during the 1952–53 NCAA men's basketball season. Under the first year of head coach Boydson Baird, the team finished the season 10–13 and 6–13 in the Southern Conference. This was the 48th season of the collegiate basketball program at William & Mary, whose nickname is now the Tribe. William & Mary played its home games at Blow Gymnasium.

The Indians finished in 12th place in the conference and failed to qualify for the Southern Conference men's basketball tournament, the first such occurrence since 1947.

Program notes
 On February 14, 1953, Bill Chambers set the NCAA record for highest single game rebound total (51) in a game against Virginia, 
Boydson Baird came to William & Mary after three seasons at Davidson, where he had a 24–53 record.
Bill Chambers was named to the second team all-Southern Conference for the second straight season.
Following the 1952–53 season, seven of William & Mary's Southern Conference co-members departed for the new Atlantic Coast Conference: Clemson, Duke, Maryland, North Carolina, North Carolina State, South Carolina, and Wake Forest.

Schedule

|-
!colspan=9 style="background:#006400; color:#FFD700;"| Regular season

Source

References

William & Mary Tribe men's basketball seasons
William and Mary Indians
William and Mary Indians Men's Basketball Team
William and Mary Indians Men's Basketball Team